Juan de Ayolas Airport  is a small airport that serves the city of Ayolas, in the Misiones Department of Paraguay. The airport is named after Juan de Ayolas. It is operated by both Argentine and Paraguayan authorities.
It's located 20 km from the Yacyretá Dam.

See also

 List of airports in Paraguay
 Transport in Paraguay

References

External links
 Direccion Nacional de Aeronautica Civil - Airports of Paraguay

Airports in Paraguay
Misiones Department